
Gmina Ojrzeń is a rural gmina (administrative district) in Ciechanów County, Masovian Voivodeship, in east-central Poland.

Villages
Gmina Ojrzeń contains the villages and settlements of Baraniec, Brodzięcin, Bronisławie, Dąbrowa, Gostomin, Grabówiec, Halinin, Kałki, Kicin, Kownaty-Borowe, Kraszewo, Łebki Wielkie, Lipówiec, Luberadz, Luberadzyk, Młock, Młock-Kopacze, Nowa Wieś, Obrąb, Ojrzeń, Osada-Wola, Przyrowa, Radziwie, Rzeszotko, Skarżynek, Trzpioły, Wojtkowa Wieś, Wola Wodzyńska, Zielona and Żochy.

Neighbouring gminas
Gmina Ojrzeń is bordered by the gminas of Ciechanów, Glinojeck, Sochocin and Sońsk.

References

Polish official population figures 2006

Ojrzen
Ciechanów County